Borvayeh-ye Albu Aziz (also Romanized as Borvāyeh-ye Ālbū ʿAzīz; also known as Alborvāyeh, Albū ‘Azīz, Almorāvīyeh, Borvāyeh, and Borvāyeh-ye ‘Azīz) is a village in Elhayi Rural District, in the Central District of Ahvaz County, Khuzestan Province, Iran. At the 2006 census, its population was 550, in 109 families.

References 

Populated places in Ahvaz County